Michael John Caruso (born May 27, 1977) is a former Major League Baseball shortstop who played for the Chicago White Sox and Kansas City Royals.

Caruso was a prospect for the San Francisco Giants drafted out of Marjory Stoneman Douglas High School in Parkland, Florida in 1996.  During the  season, Caruso was one of six prospects (along with Keith Foulke, Bob Howry, Lorenzo Barceló, Ken Vining, and Brian Manning) traded to the White Sox in exchange for Wilson Álvarez, Danny Darwin, and Roberto Hernández in what became known as the White Flag Trade.

In 1998, Caruso was called up by the White Sox at the age of 20 to become their everyday starting shortstop.  He finished third in the Major League Baseball Rookie of the Year Award balloting.  However, his career in Chicago only lasted two years. He reemerged back into the Major Leagues in 2002 with the Royals, but only played in 12 games.

After two years out of the game, Caruso began a comeback attempt.  He played the 2007 season for the South Georgia Peanuts of the independent South Coast League.  However, the South Coast League only lasted one season before suspending operations.  He then played for the Joliet JackHammers.

References

External links

Mike Caruso at Baseball Almanac

1977 births
Living people
Chicago White Sox players
Kansas City Royals players
Major League Baseball shortstops
Sportspeople from Queens, New York
Baseball players from New York City
Charlotte Knights players
Bellingham Giants players
Winston-Salem Warthogs players
San Jose Giants players
Durham Bulls players
Chattanooga Lookouts players
Omaha Royals players
Joliet JackHammers players
Long Island Ducks players
Newark Bears players
Lancaster Barnstormers players
South Georgia Peanuts players